Malevolence is a 2004 independent American slasher film written, produced and directed by Stevan Mena, and starring Samantha Dark and R. Brandon Johnson. The plot follows a mother and her adolescent daughter who are held hostage by bank robbers at an abandoned house; the robbers'  plans are disrupted when they are all confronted by a serial killer who resides on a nearby property.

Filmed over a period of two years on a budget of $200,000, Malevolence was purchased by Anchor Bay Films, who gave it a limited theatrical release in September 2004, and a DVD release in 2005. It received mixed reviews from critics, with some criticizing its referentiality and depiction of violence, while others praised it for its establishment of atmosphere and suspense.

The film was followed by a prequel Bereavement in 2010 and a sequel Malevolence 3: Killer in 2018.

Plot
On May 14, 1989, six-year-old abductee Martin Bristol, whose face has been disfigured by his captor, watches as he butchers a young woman in the basement of a farmhouse.

Ten years later, on September 20, 1999, Julian and his girlfriend Marylin enact a bank heist with Marylin's ex-convict brother, Max, and accomplice Kurt, taking around $500,000. Max, who was shot by a security guard in the melee, dies in the car with Julian and Marylin; Kurt leaves in a separate car with the money, but breaks down en route to their meeting place: An abandoned house in the woods. Kurt takes Samantha Harrison and her adolescent daughter, Courtney, hostage from a gas station, forcing them to drive him to the house.

When they arrive, he binds and gags them, and leaves a large portion of the money stowed in the van. Courtney manages to free herself and flees, stumbling upon a large abandoned farm nearby. In pursuit, Kurt searches a vacant garage on the property before entering a house, which is dilapidated and filled with degraded furnishings. Inside, he is clobbered with a metal pulley and stabbed to death by an unseen assailant.

After burying Max's body in a field, Julian and Marylin drive to the abandoned house to meet with Kurt and divide the money. Arriving at nightfall, they find Samantha tied up and sleeping on the floor, and Kurt nowhere in sight. Julian takes his car to search for Kurt, leaving Marylin alone at the house with Samantha. From the foyer, Samantha watches as a man wearing Kurt's sack mask descends the stairs, but is unable to warn Marylin as her mouth is taped shut. The man drags Marylin into the dining room and stabs her to death. Meanwhile, while driving on backroads, Julian catches the attention of a parked police officer, and quickly retreats to the house, where he finds the entryway floor soaked in blood, and Samantha hiding in a closet. Samantha tells him that Kurt returned to the house and killed Marylin.

Julian and Samantha leave on foot to search for Courtney, and also stumble upon the adjacent farm property. While investigating the house there, they find Courtney locked in an upstairs closet with Kurt's corpse. As Samantha unties Courtney's arms, the man in the sack mask attacks Julian and incapacitates Samantha and Courtney. Samantha awakens in the basement hanging from the ceiling. As the killer approaches her with a knife, she manages to pull down the metal piping from the ceiling, freeing herself, and flees with Courtney. The killer pursues them, and Julian is left alone in the farm, where he discovers numerous corpses in various states of decay, and finds Marylin's body posed against an arrangement of human and animal bones.

Samantha and Courtney return to the adjacent house to retrieve the van keys. As they are about to leave, Samantha sees the killer coming toward the house, and the two retreat to a bedroom upstairs to hide, but the killer finds and attacks them. Julian arrives and shoots him, but he does not die immediately. Samantha smashes a chair over the killer's head, knocking him unconscious. Julian removes his mask, revealing a young man with a scar across his face; the killer is Martin Bristol, now a teenager. The three flee, and the police officer arrives at the house just as Samantha and Courtney exit. Julian stumbles out after them holding a gun, and the officer shoots him to death. When the officer goes upstairs to locate Martin, he has vanished.

The following morning, forensic investigators remove numerous bodies from the farm property, and uncover journals from the serial killer who abducted Martin and groomed him to be a killer himself. The journals suggest that Martin, who gained strength as he grew into adulthood, killed his abductor in the manners in which he was taught. That evening, Samantha prepares to go to bed; on the floor is the duffel bag full of the money that Kurt left in her van. While she and Courtney lie down to sleep, the closet door behind them opens.

Cast
Samantha Dark as Samantha Harrison
R. Brandon Johnson as Julian
Heather Magee as Marylin
Richard Glover as Kurt
Courtney Bertolone as Courtney Harrison
John Richard Ingram as Sheriff Riley
Keith Chambers as Max
Jay Cohen as Martin Bristol
David K. Guida II as Martin Bristol 
Kevin McKelvey as Special Agent William Perkins

Production

Concept 
Writer and director Stevan Mena began working on the script for the film in 1995, which went through various iterations. In it, he said his intentions were to craft a slasher film that also explored the idea of nature versus nurture in relation to how people become serial killers.

Filming
Malevolence was shot over a period of two years between late 2000 and December 2002. Various production setbacks occurred, one of which included the crew being banned from the original shooting location in Long Island: The production crew received permission to use an abandoned home in which to shoot the film, only to discover two days before principal photography that the home had in fact been foreclosed on, and the man who gave them the permission the former owner. The film was shot on 35mm film by documentary cinematographer Tsuyoshi Kimono, who had previously shot documentaries for A&E.

The bank robbery scenes were shot in Allentown, Pennsylvania, and additional photography in the car scenes was shot in Bethlehem. The farm and slaughterhouse property was shot at an actual abandoned cattle farm and slaughterhouse built in 1920 in Pennsylvania.

Release 
Malevolence was given a limited theatrical release in 10 theaters in the United States on September 10, 2004 through Anchor Bay Films. In Spain, the film was distributed by Sherlock Films and opened in 101 theaters.

Reception

Box office 
The film grossed $126,021 in the United States and $220,085 internationally for a worldwide box office of $346,085. Nearly half of its international box office came from Spain, grossing over $131,000 there.

Critical reception

Ned Martel of The New York Times said the film "will lead Halloween-inspired viewers into this dark place for some palpitations, but the thrills will come from sheer density of gruesome images, not from frightfully new ideas." Varietys Dennis Harvey said of the film: "The mark of a good horror director is seldom in onscreen gore, but rather the ability to make every anticipatory moment tingle with dread. On that level, Stevan Mena’s first feature Malevolence scores well, building a grim atmosphere sans Scream-style winking to tell its tale of bank robbers who choose the wrong abandoned rural house to hide out in."

Rober Dominiquez of the New York Daily News gave the film 1.5 out of 4 stars, writing that the film "turns out to be nothing more than a derivative thriller featuring yet another silent, masked killer. Mena has a gift for sustaining tension, and there are a couple of moments that make you jump. But the acting and dialogue is as silly as the potato sack the killer wears on his head." Maitland McDonagh of TV Guide awarded the film 2 out of 4 stars, writing, calling it "a straightforward throwback to old-school slasher movies that wears its influences on its bloody sleeve and delivers a solid ratio of suspense to shocks." Mark Holcomb of The Village Voice panned the film, calling it "laughably unscary," and marked by "dimensionless medium shots and ham-fisted symbolic imagery."

Malevolence won  three best feature film awards at the 2003 International Film Expo. Director Stevan Mena won in a separate category for best director in the same year.

Prequel
On February 2, 2010, Mena announced that he planned a prequel to his film. Bereavement stars Michael Biehn and John Savage as well as Nolan Gerard Funk and Alexandra Daddario.

Sequel
A sequel Malevolence 3: Killer was released on October 12, 2018 along with Blu-ray re-releases of the first 2 movies.

References

External links

 

2004 films
2004 horror films
2000s slasher films
2000s crime thriller films
2000s serial killer films
American independent films
American slasher films
Films about bank robbery
Films set in 1989
Films set in 1999
Films set in abandoned houses
Films set on farms
Films shot in Allentown, Pennsylvania
Backwoods slasher films
2000s English-language films
2000s American films